José María Peralta (December 1807 – December 6, 1883) was born in San Salvador. He was President of El Salvador from 15 February to 12 March 1859. 

He died in San Salvador. His descendants include son Jose Maria Peralta Lagos (1873–1944), writer, military engineer and politician, grandson Jose Maria Peralta Salazar (1908–1964), president of the Salvadoran Senate and diplomat,  great-grandson Jose Maria Peralta Salazar II (1947–1999), Salvadoran lawyer and law professor at the National University of El Salvador, and great-granddaughter  Ana Carolina Peralta Bierman, American lawyer and academic (1974).

See also 
 History of El Salvador

References and notes 

Presidents of El Salvador
1807 births
1883 deaths
People from San Salvador